Gao Jianli (Chinese: 高漸離) was a musician of the Chinese state of Yan, during the Warring States period, who played a struck zither called zhu (筑) or ji zhu (击筑).

Legend
After his friend Jing Ke was killed during his assassination attempt on Qin Shi Huang, Gao changed his name and became an assistant in a wine shop, fearing reprisals from Qin Shi Huang. 

Gao Jianli's skill as a zhu player eventually came to the attention of the owner of the wine shop. Qin Shi Huang heard about Gao's ability and summoned Gao to play for him. When Gao's identity was eventually revealed, Qin Shi Huang had him blinded, but pardoned him due to his love of music.

After a few performances the Emperor relaxed his guarding of Gao. Sensing the change, Gao secretly hid pieces of lead in the instrument, and when he got an opportunity, attempted to assassinate the Emperor himself, without success. Gao was subsequently executed.

Depiction in films and TV series
1996 – The Emperor's Shadow (秦颂; literally "Ode of Qin" or "Anthem of Qin"). Directed by Zhou Xiaowen, starring Ge You as Gao Jianli.
1999 – The Emperor and the Assassin (荊柯刺秦王). Directed by Chen Kaige, starring Zhao Benshan as Gao Jianli.
2004 – Assassinator Jing Ke (荊軻傳奇). Executive producer Han Sanping, starring Peter Ho as Gao Jianli, Liu Ye as Jing Ke.
2007 – The Legend of Qin (animated TV series) Animation

Failed regicides
Chinese assassins
People executed for attempted murder
Executed Qin dynasty people
Qin dynasty musicians
People executed by the Qin dynasty
3rd-century BC executions
Year of birth unknown
3rd-century BC Chinese people
Ancient murderers

References